District One was one of the five constituencies represented in the Regional Assembly of Murcia, the regional legislature of the Region of Murcia. The constituency elected seven deputies. It comprised the municipalities of Lorca, Aguilas, Puerto Lumbreras, Totana, Alhama de Murcia, Librilla, Aledo and Mazarrón. The electoral system used the D'Hondt method and a closed-list proportional representation, with a minimum threshold of five percent regionally.

Electoral system
The constituency was created as per the Statute of Autonomy for the Region of Murcia of 1982 and was first contested in the 1983 regional election. The Statute provided for sub-provincial divisions of the Principality's territory to be established as multi-member districts in the Regional Assembly of Murcia, with this regulation being maintained under the 1986 regional electoral law. Each constituency was entitled to an initial minimum of one seat, with the remaining 40 being distributed in proportion to their populations. The exception was the 1983 election, when constituencies were allocated one fixed member and one additional member per each 25,000 inhabitants or fraction greater than 12,500.

Voting was on the basis of universal suffrage, which comprised all nationals over eighteen, registered in the Region of Murcia and in full enjoyment of their political rights. Amendments to the electoral law in 2011 required for Murcians abroad to apply for voting before being permitted to vote, a system known as "begged" or expat vote. Seats were elected using the D'Hondt method and a closed list proportional representation, with an electoral threshold of five percent of valid votes—which included blank ballots—being applied regionally. The use of the D'Hondt method might result in a higher effective threshold, depending on the district magnitude.

The electoral law allowed for parties and federations registered in the interior ministry, coalitions and groupings of electors to present lists of candidates. Parties and federations intending to form a coalition ahead of an election were required to inform the relevant Electoral Commission within ten days of the election call—fifteen before 1985—whereas groupings of electors needed to secure the signature of at least two percent of the electorate in the constituencies for which they sought election—one-thousandth of the electorate, with a compulsory minimum of 500 signatures, until 1985—disallowing electors from signing for more than one list of candidates.

A 2015 legal amendment saw the abolition of the five constituencies and their replacement by a single multi-member district comprising all the municipalities in the autonomous community. The electoral threshold was also lowered from five to three percent.

Deputies

Elections

2015 regional election

2011 regional election

2007 regional election

2003 regional election

1999 regional election

1995 regional election

1991 regional election

1987 regional election

1983 regional election

References

Regional Assembly of Murcia constituencies
Region of Murcia
Constituencies established in 1983
Constituencies disestablished in 2015
1983 establishments in Spain
2015 disestablishments in Spain